Anter is a surname. Notable people with the surname include:

Musa Anter (1920–1992), Kurdish-Turkish writer, journalist, and intellectual
Natalie Anter (born 1980), Italian softball player

See also
Ante (name)